tert-Amyl alcohol (TAA) or 2-methylbutan-2-ol (2M2B), is a branched pentanol.

Historically TAA has been used an anesthetic and more recently used as a recreational drug. TAA is mostly a positive allosteric modulator for GABAA receptors in the same way as ethanol. The psychotropic effects of TAA and ethanol are similar, though distinct. Impact on coordination and balance are proportionately more prominent with TAA, which is significantly more potent by weight than ethanol.

TAA is a colorless liquid with a burning flavor and an unpleasant odor similar to paraldehyde with a hint of camphor. TAA remains as a liquid at room temperature making it a useful alternative solvent to tert-butyl alcohol.

Production
TAA is primarily made by the hydration of 2-methyl-2-butene in the presence of an acidic catalyst.
On the other hand, it could be product from acetone and acetylene by Favorskii reaction to give 2-Methylbut-3-yn-2-ol, then hydrogenation with Raney nickel catalyst to give Tert-Amyl alcohol.

Natural occurrence
Fusel alcohols like TAA are grain fermentation byproducts and therefore trace amounts of TAA are present in many alcoholic beverages. Traces of TAA have been detected in other foods, like fried bacon, cassava and rooibos tea.
TAA is also present in rabbit milk and seems to play a role of pheromone inducing suckling in the newborn rabbit.

History
From about 1880s to 1950s, TAA was used as an anesthetic with the contemporary name of amylene hydrate, but was rarely used solely because of the existence of more efficient drugs. In the 1930s, TAA was mainly used as a solvent for the primary anesthetic tribromoethanol (TBE). Like chloroform, TBE is toxic for the liver, so the use of such solutions declined in the 1940s in humans. TBE-TAA-solutions remained in use as short-acting anesthetics for laboratory mice and rats. Such solutions are sometimes called Avertin, which was a brand name for the now discontinued TAA and TBE solution with a volume ratio of 0.5:1 made by the Winthrop Laboratories. Nowadays TAA has found use as a recreational drug.

Use and effects 
Ingestion or inhalation of TAA causes euphoria, sedative, hypnotic, and anticonvulsant effects similar to ethanol. When ingested, the effects of TAA may begin in about 30 minutes and can last up to 1–2 days. 2–4 grams of TAA causes unconsciousness. About 100 g of ethanol induces a similar level of unconsciousness.

Overdose and toxicity 
The smallest known dose of TAA that has killed a person is 30 mL.

An overdose produces symptoms similar to alcohol poisoning and is a medical emergency due to the sedative/depressant properties which manifest in overdose as potentially lethal respiratory depression. Sudden loss of consciousness, simultaneous respiratory and metabolic acidosis, fast heartbeat, increased blood pressure, pupil constriction, coma, respiratory depression and death may follow from an overdose. The oral  in rats is 1 g/kg. The subcutaneous LD50 in mice is 2.1 g/kg.

Metabolism 
In rats, TAA is primarily metabolized via glucuronidation, as well as by oxidation to 2-methyl-2,3-butanediol. It is likely that the same path is followed in humans, though older sources suggest TAA is excreted unchanged.

The use of TAA cannot be detected with general ethanol tests or other ordinary drug tests. Its use can be detected from a blood or a urine sample by using gas chromatography–mass spectrometry for up to 48 hours after consumption.

See also 
 1-Ethynylcyclohexanol
 2-Methyl-1-butanol
 2-Methyl-2-pentanol
 3-Methyl-3-pentanol
 Alcohols
 Amyl alcohol
 Diethylpropanediol
 Pentanols
 Ethchlorvynol
 Methylpentynol

References 

Alcohol solvents
Tertiary alcohols
Sedatives
Designer drugs
GABAA receptor positive allosteric modulators
Alkanols